Felipe Andrés Argel Ojeda (born 18 April 1990) is a Chilean footballer.

His last professional club was Deportes Puerto Montt.

External links
 
 

1990 births
Living people
Chilean footballers
Primera B de Chile players
Chilean Primera División players
C.D. Arturo Fernández Vial footballers
Provincial Osorno footballers
Puerto Montt footballers
Ñublense footballers
Association football forwards
People from Puerto Varas